Abeiku Gyekye Jackson (also spelled Abeku, born 12 April 2000 in Accra) is a Ghanaian swimmer specialising in the 50 metre freestyle. He competed in the 100m freestyle, 50m butterfly, and 100m butterfly at the 2014 Commonwealth Games. He holds Ghanaian national records in 13 disciplines, including freestyle, butterfly, breaststroke and backstroke events over distances from 50 to 400 metres. His older brother Kwesi Abbiw Jackson and younger brother Kow Asafua Jackson are also swimmers.

Jackson represented Ghana in the 50 metre freestyle at the 2016 Summer Olympics in Rio de Janeiro, Brazil.
Jackson and female swimmer Kaya Forson, who competed in the 200 metre freestyle in Rio, became the first Ghanaians ever to compete in swimming at the Olympic Games.

He competed in the men's 100 metre butterfly event at the 2020 Summer Olympics.

Competition record

Individual

Long course

Short course

Relay

Long course

References

External links 
 
 
 
 
 
 
 

2000 births
Living people
Ghanaian male swimmers
Olympic swimmers of Ghana
Commonwealth Games competitors for Ghana
Swimmers at the 2014 Commonwealth Games
Swimmers at the 2018 Commonwealth Games
Swimmers at the 2022 Commonwealth Games
Swimmers at the 2016 Summer Olympics
Swimmers at the 2020 Summer Olympics
Swimmers at the 2018 Summer Youth Olympics
Swimmers at the 2019 African Games
African Games competitors for Ghana